Ludolf von Sudheim, also called Ludolph von Suchem, was a German priest who is primarily known as the author of an account of his time in the Levant and a history of the fall of the Crusader states. Little is known of his life other than he spent the years 1336-1341 travelling in the Holy Land and the Eastern Mediterranean islands.

Works

Further reading

External links 

 
 
 
 :it:Ludolfo di Sudheim 

14th-century German Roman Catholic priests
14th-century German writers
German male writers
14th-century Latin writers